Stelis zunagensis is a species of orchid plant native to Ecuador.

References 

zunagensis
Flora of Ecuador
Plants described in 2001